Hayter may refer to:

Places
 Hayter, Virginia, an unincorporated community
 Hayter, Alberta, Canada, a hamlet
 Hayter Road, Edmonton, Alberta
 Mount Hayter, Oates Land, Antarctica
 Hayter Peak, Heard Island, Indian Ocean

Other uses
 Hayter (lawn mowers), a manufacturer and distributor of domestic and commercial lawn mowers 
 Hayter (surname), a list of people and one fictional character
 Hayter Reed (1849–1936), Canadian politician
 Baron Hayter, a title in the Peerage of the United Kingdom
 USS Hayter (DE-212), a destroyer escort